Pleasure Principle is the debut album by the female P-Funk spin off group Parlet. The album was released in 1978 by Casablanca Records and was produced by P-Funk leader/producer George Clinton. Parlet consisted of Mallia Franklin, Debbie Wright, and Jeanette Washington. The album features heavy involvement from the P-Funk musical collective.

The track "Cookie Jar" was originally written and recorded by Clarence "Fuzzy" Haskins.

In 1992, Pleasure Principle was reissued on CD in Japan by the Casablanca/Polystar label, but quickly went out of print. On July 30, 2013, Real Gone Music in the U.S. reissued both Pleasure Principle and Invasion of the Booty Snatchers, featuring liner notes by former P-Funk minister of information Tom Vickers.

Track listing
"Pleasure Principle" (George Clinton, Ron Ford, Bernie Worrell) (released as single Casablanca NB 919) 8:58
"Love Amnesia" (George Clinton, Ron Dunbar, Billy Bass Nelson) 5:22
"Cookie Jar" (Clarence "Fuzzy" Haskins)  (released as a single-Casablanca NB 932) 5:43
"Misunderstanding" (George Clinton, Ron Ford, Bernie Worrell) 7:26
"Are You Dreaming?" (Linda Brown, Garry Shider, George Clinton) 7:10
"Mr. Melody Man" (Gary Cooper, Ron Dunbar) 5:07

Personnel
Parlet
Debbie Wright, Jeanette Washington, Mallia Franklin - vocals
with:
Garry Shider, Michael Hampton, Glenn Goins, Billy Bass Nelson - guitar
Rodney "Skeet" Curtis, Billy Bass Nelson, Rick Gilmore - bass
Jim Wright, Frank Waddy, Bootsy Collins, Gary Cooper, Jerome Brailey.- drums
Bernie Worrell - keyboards
Fred Wesley, Maceo Parker, Rick Gardner, Richard Griffith - horns
Brandye, Ron Ford - backing vocals
Technical
Jerry Estes, Jim Vitti, Mike Iacopelli - recording engineer
Shusei Nagaoka - cover illustration

References 

1978 debut albums
Parlet albums
Casablanca Records albums